The Guittard Chocolate Company is an American-based chocolate maker which produces couverture chocolate, using original formulas and traditional French methods. The company is headquartered in Burlingame, California. It is the oldest continuously family-owned chocolate company in the United States, having been family-owned for more than four generations.

History
Guittard Chocolate was founded by Etienne "Eddy" Guittard (1838–1899), who immigrated to the United States from Tournus, France, in the 1850s during the California Gold Rush. He brought French chocolates with him, which he traded for supplies. After trying without success for three years to strike gold in the Sierra, he returned to San Francisco, where shopkeepers with whom he had earlier traded his chocolate convinced him to become a chocolate maker. He then returned to Paris, saved money to buy the equipment he needed, before returning to San Francisco and opening his business at 405 Sansome Street on the San Francisco waterfront. Initially, he also sold items such as tea, coffee, and spices alongside his chocolate.

Horace C. Guittard, Étienne's son, was in charge when the 1906 San Francisco earthquake destroyed the city. In the aftermath of the quake, a new plant was built on Commercial Street. The company expanded in 1921 and 1936 onto property on Main Street south of Market. 

In 1954, Guittard sold its property to the city so that Embarcadero Freeway could be built. The company relocated to a  facility at the corner of Guittard and Rollins road in Burlingame, California, where it is still located today.

Gary Guittard began working full-time at the company in 1975. He replaced Horace A. Guittard (his father) in 1989, becoming president and CEO.

Products
The company produces cocoa, chocolate syrup, milk chocolate balls and eggs, baking chips, as well as mints and mint wafers. 85% of Guittard's clients are food industry professionals, while 15% are pastry chefs. Customers include See's Candies, Rocky Mountain Chocolate Factory, Kellogg's, Baskin-Robbins, Recchiuti Confections, Garrison Confections, and Williams Sonoma. The company also sells to chef Donald Wressel and has recently developed a variety of chocolate bars specifically designed for amateur bakers.

References

Chocolate companies based in California
Companies based in Burlingame, California
Food and drink in the San Francisco Bay Area
American companies established in 1868
1868 establishments in California
Food and drink companies established in 1868
Family-owned companies of the United States